Motus is a workforce management company headquartered in Boston, Massachusetts, that develops fleet management software.

History 

Motus was founded in 2004 as Corporate Reimbursement Services, Inc. (CRS) by Gregg Darish, and changed its name to Motus in 2014. Craig Powell (businessman and entrepreneur) led the Company for 9 years through accelerated growth.  He retired from his role as the President and CEO in January of 2022, after scaling the business from roughly $10 million in revenues to $150M and selling the business.  He currently serves as an advisor to the Board of Directors.

In August 2014, Motus released an integration with American cloud computing company Salesforce.com to instantly associate business stops with accounts, contacts and leads in the Salesforce customer relationship management (CRM) product.

In 2015, Motus announced an integration with American travel management company Concur Technologies to allow employees to submit mileage to Motus, calculate individual reimbursement amounts, and automatically create expense reports in Concur Expense for manager approval.

In September 2015, Motus released an integration with Oracle Corporation to instantly associate Motus administrative activities with Oracle customer relationship management (CRM) software.

In 2018, Motus was acquired by private equity and growth capital firm Thoma Bravo, LLC and merged with Runzheimer, creating the leading provider of mileage reimbursement technologies serving the nation's most complex transportation companies. It also partnered with FleetCor Technologies, Inc., which provides fuel cards and workforce payment products and services.

In September 2019, Motus acquired the Danvers, Massachusetts, based mobile expense management firm Wireless Analytics.

In September 2020, Motus acquired the Augusta, Georgia, firm, Vision Wireless, further strengthening their mobile expense management services.

Recognition 
Motus was named one of the 20 Most Promising Field Service Solution Providers by CIOReview, Top 10 Fleet Management Solution Providers by Logistics Tech Outlook, and Best Employee Efficiency Technology by MITX in 2017. It also won a 2018 HRO Today TekTonic Award in the Mobile category. The company has been named among the best places to work in Boston and Milwaukee, company of the year, and one of the largest mobile technology companies in Massachusetts.

References

See also 
 Business mileage reimbursement rate
 Tax deduction
 Vehicle miles traveled tax

2004 establishments in Massachusetts
Software companies established in 2004
Companies based in Boston
Business software companies
Human resource management software
Software companies based in Massachusetts
2018 mergers and acquisitions
Private equity portfolio companies
Software companies of the United States